Maîtrise Notre Dame de Paris is a pre-college music school situated in Paris, France. Its origins can be dated to the 12th century and are associated with the rise of the cathedral of Notre-Dame.

External links
 Notre-Dame de Paris's Singers

Education in Paris
Notre-Dame de Paris